Betty O'Rourke (born 12 May 1930 in Enfield, North London, England - died 2006 in Reading, Berkshire, England) was a British writer of over 14 romance novels from 1987 to 2005, she also wrote under the pseudonyms Elizabeth Stevens and William Newham. She was vice-president of the Romantic Novelists' Association and she was the acting Membership Secretary of the RNA.

Biography
Elizabeth Margaret was born on 12 May 1930 in Reading, Berkshire, England. She started to work in a library at 20, and met her future husband at Library School, and worked as a librarian. During her first two years of marriage, they lived in United States. They had four children. She lived in her native Reading until her death.

Bibliography

As Betty O'Rourke

Single novels
Pageantry of Love (1987)
Mists of Remembrance (1989)
Island of the Gods (1996)
Nightingale Summer (1997)
The Icon of the Czar (1998)
Penhaligon's Rock (2000)
Copper Rose (2000)
The Eagle and the Rose (2002)
The Pageant Master (2003)
After Michael (2005)

As Elizabeth Stevens

Single novels
 Forbidden Love (1996)
 A Company Affair (1997)
 The Unwelcome Guest (2003)
 Hetty's Highwayman (2005)

References and sources

English romantic fiction writers
1930 births
2006 deaths
20th-century English novelists